Romania is set to participate in the Eurovision Song Contest 2023 in Liverpool, United Kingdom, with "D.G.T. (Off and On)" performed by Theodor Andrei. The Romanian broadcaster  (TVR) organised the national final  2023 on 11 February 2023 in order to select the Romanian entry for the 2023 contest.

Background 

Prior to the 2023 contest, Romania had participated in the Eurovision Song Contest 22 times since its first entry in 1994. To this point, Romania has qualified to the final 14 out of 17 times since the introduction of semi-finals to the format of the contest in 2004. In , "" by WRS qualfied to the final and placed 18th.

The Romanian national broadcaster,  (TVR), broadcasts the event within Romania and organizes the selection process for the nation's entry. TVR has consistently selected the Romanian Eurovision entry through national finals that feature a competition among several artists and songs, except in  when the Romanian entry was internally selected. Despite threatening a possible withdrawal in response to the nation's suspended jury votes in the 2022 contest, the broadcaster confirmed their intentions to participate at the 2023 Eurovision Song Contest on 26 August 2022 after dropping all objections towards the EBU. TVR had set up national finals with several artists to choose both the song and performer to compete at Eurovision for Romania, a procedure which the broadcaster opted for once again to select their 2023 entry.

Before Eurovision

Selecția Națională 2023 
 2023 was the national final format developed by TVR in order to select Romania's entry for the Eurovision Song Contest 2023. The competition took place at the TVR studios on 11 February 2023.

Competing entries 
TVR opened a submission period for artists and composers to submit their entries between 14 November 2022 and 11 December 2022. Composers were able to submit songs without a performer and should this be the case, the performers would be chosen by TVR in consultation with their composers. The broadcaster received 85 submissions after the submission deadline passed. An expert committee consisting of Sebastian Ferenț (Untold and Neversea), Laura Coroianu (Emagic), Bogdan Strătulă (Urban Sunsets Radio), John Varbiu (Summer Well), Alin Vaida (Jazz in the Park), Mihai Predescu (Head of the Romanian delegation at the Eurovision Song Contest) and Remus Achim (project director of the national final) reviewed the received submissions between 14 to 16 December 2022. Each juror on the committee rated each song between 1 (lowest) and 10 (highest) based on criteria such as the melodic harmony, structure and lyrics of the song, the orchestral arrangement, originality and stylistic diversity of the composition, sound and voice quality as well as the overall interpretative, visual and artistic quality. After the combination of the jury votes, the top twelve entries that scored the highest were selected for the national final. The competing entries were announced on 17 December 2022. Among the artists, Andrada Popa previously represent Romania in the Junior Eurovision Song Contest 2008 along side Mădălina Lefter.

Final 
The final took place on 11 February 2023. Twelve songs competed and the winner was selected exclusively by a public vote through televoting and online voting.

At Eurovision 
According to Eurovision rules, all nations with the exceptions of the host country and the "Big Five" (France, Germany, Italy, Spain and the United Kingdom) are required to qualify from one of two semi-finals in order to compete for the final; the top ten countries from each semi-final progress to the final. The European Broadcasting Union (EBU) split up the competing countries into six different pots based on voting patterns from previous contests, with countries with favourable voting histories put into the same pot. On 31 January 2023, an allocation draw was held, which placed each country into one of the two semi-finals, and determined which half of the show they would perform in. Romania has been placed into the second semi-final, to be held on 11 May 2023, and has been scheduled to perform in the first half of the show.

References 

2023
Countries in the Eurovision Song Contest 2023
Eurovision
Eurovision